Red Lake Road railway station is located in the community of Red Lake Road in Unorganized Kenora District in Northwestern Ontario, Canada. The station is on the Canadian National Railway transcontinental main line, between Quibell to the west and Lash to the east, has a passing track, and is in use by Via Rail as a stop for transcontinental Canadian trains. Highway 105 passes to the east of the stop.

References

External links
 Red Lake Road railway station

Via Rail stations in Ontario
Railway stations in Kenora District